Royal Football Club de Liège (more commonly known as RFC Liège) is a professional football club based in Liège, Belgium. It currently plays in the Belgian First Amateur Division. Its matricule is 4, meaning that it was the fourth club to register with the country's national federation (founded 1895), and the club was the first Belgian champion in history (5 Championships & 1 Cup).  The 'philosophy' of the club is based on integration of local young players and on popular and faithful support. The club was also known for being 'homeless' between 1995 and 2015, but is now playing on its own ground in the Rocourt area of Liège.

In 1990, FC Liège precipitated a ground-breaking ruling for European football, when its refusal to release Jean-Marc Bosman after his contract ran out led to the Bosman ruling, a European Court of Justice decision that caused major changes to the structure of European football.

History 

It was founded in 1892 as Liège Football Club (Liège FC) and became an inaugural (1895) member of the Belgian Football Association as Football Club Liégeois (FC Liégeois). In 1896, the club became the first ever Belgian Champion, and is still the only club that has played all its seasons (117 as of 2019–20) at a national level, versus county or local levels. The club has won five First Division championships: 1896, 1898, 1899, 1952 and 1953.

In 1920 the prefix Royal was, when the club changed its name to Royal Football Club Liégeois (RFC Liégeois). Its name had been shortened to RFC Liège by the time of its consecutive championships in 1952 and 1953, the only clubs able to contest a dominating streak by Anderlecht, which won the three championships before (1949–1951) and after (1954–1956). RFC Liégeois reached the 1963–64 Inter-Cities Fairs Cup semi-finals, losing in three games against the eventual winner of the Cup, Spain's Real Zaragoza. Between 1965 and 1985, there were poor results, and the club survived with the help of its own tradition: young players coming from inside the club, and faithful supporters.

At the end of the 1980s, RFC Liège played in European competitions, facing such notable clubs as Benfica, Juventus, Rapid Vienna, Hibernian, Werder Bremen and Athletic Bilbao. The club won a Belgian Cup in 1990.

In 1995, the club faced bankruptcy when its stadium, Stade Vélodrome de Rocourt, was sold and demolished to build a movie theatre. To survive, the club joined with R.F.C. Tilleur-Saint-Nicolas, based in the Liège suburb of Saint-Nicolas, to become R. Tilleur F.C. de Liège.

The club went down from the First Division (which it had not left since 1945) to the Third Division. The word Tilleur was dropped from the team name in 2000, returning to "RFC Liège".

From 1995 to 2009, the club moved between the Second and Third Divisions, with two Third Division titles in 1996 and 2008.

In 2008–09, the club played in the Second Division, but suffered back to back relegations, dropping to the Fourth Division in April 2011.

In the 2015–16 season, RFC Liège plays in Division 3.

Stadium 
Starting in 1921, RFC Liège played in Stade Vélodrome de Rocourt, in the suburban municipality of Rocourt. Rocourt became part of the city of Liège in 1977. The stadium was sold, and demolished, in 1995, earning RFC Liège the nickname 'homeless'.

Between 1995 and 2015, RFC Liège played in Tilleur (1995–2000), Seraing (2000–2004), Ans (2004–2008), and Seraing (Pairay Stadium, 2008–2015).

In 2015 the club returned to Rocourt, playing its home matches in the new Stade de Rocourt.

Current squad

Staff 
Head coach:  Gaëtan Englebert 
Assistant coach:  Eric Deflandre
Goalkeeper coach:  Pierre Drouguet

Honours

League
Belgian First Division
Champions (5): 1895–96, 1897–98, 1898–99, 1951–52, 1952–53 
Runners-up: 1896–97, 1958–59, 1960–61
Belgian Second Division
Winners: 1911–12, 1922–23, 1943–44
Belgian Third Division
Winners: 1942–43, 1995–96, 2006–07
Belgian Fourth Division
Winners: 2014–15

Cups
Belgian Cup
Winners: 1989–90
Runners-up: 1986–87
Belgian League Cup
Winners: 1986
Runners-up: 1973

References 
 Official website

 
Association football clubs established in 1892
Football clubs in Belgium
1892 establishments in Belgium
Organisations based in Belgium with royal patronage
RFC Liège
Belgian Pro League clubs